Ningcheng County (Mongolian:   Нинчэн шянь Niŋčėŋ siyan) is a county of southeastern Inner Mongolia, People's Republic of China, bordering Liaoning province to the east. It is under the administration of Chifeng City.

The county contains the historical site of "Liao Middle Capital" Dading Fu, one of five capitals of Liao. The city was later conquered by the 12th-century Jurchen Jin dynasty, who also named it as their Middle Capital; later they renamed it as the Northern Capital after moving the court to present-day Beijing. Today, all that remains of the historical capital are two pagodas, one built by the Liao dynasty and one built by the Jin dynasty; they are located near Daming Town, about 20km west of the county government Tianyi Town, and about 120km south of the prefectural city Chifeng.

Climate

References

See also 
 1290 Zhili earthquake

County-level divisions of Inner Mongolia
Chifeng